Jalan Kluang–Renggam or Jalan Mengkibol (Johor state route J25) is a major road in Johor, Malaysia.

List of junctions

Roads in Johor